Slobozia Ciorăști is a commune located in Vrancea County, Romania. It is composed of three villages: Armeni, Jiliște and Slobozia Ciorăști.

References

Communes in Vrancea County
Localities in Muntenia